Acacia dangarensis, commonly known as the Mount Dangar wattle, is a species of Acacia native to eastern Australia. It can be found in some parts of Goulburn River National Park in New South Wales.

See also
 List of Acacia species

References

dangarensis
Fabales of Australia
Flora of New South Wales